The Western Market was established in December 1841 on a site bounded by Market, Collins and William Streets, and Flinders Lane. The market was Melbourne's first official fruit and vegetable market but, like the Eastern Market, its popularity was succeeded by the Queen Victoria Market. It traded for 90 years. The buildings were demolished in 1961.

References

External links
 1841–1930s: The Western & Eastern Markets at Only Melbourne

Retail markets in Melbourne
Buildings and structures in Melbourne City Centre
1841 establishments in Australia
1962 disestablishments in Australia
Demolished buildings and structures in Melbourne
Buildings and structures demolished in 1961

Market halls
Food retailers